Tamarua (previously Mangonui) is one of the six traditional districts of the island of Mangaia in the Cook Islands. It is located in the southeast of the island, to the south of the District of Ivirua and east of the District of Veitatei. The district was traditionally divided into 9 tapere:
 Maru-kore
 Poutoa-i-uta
 Poutoa-i-miri
 Akaea
 Te-vai-kao
 Angauru (Autaki)
 Vaitangi (Pukuotoi)
 Te-vai-taeta-i-uta
 Te-vai-taeta-i-tai

References

Districts of the Cook Islands
Mangaia